Hinckley Vaovasa (born 18 June 1984) is a New Zealand-born Romanian rugby union football player. He plays in the fly-half position for professional Liga Națională de Rugby club Steaua București. 

Hincley also plays for Romania's national team, the Oaks, making his international debut in a test match against the Uruguay national rugby union team.

References

External links

Allrugby profile

1998 births
Living people
Romanian rugby union players
Romania international rugby union players
SCM Rugby Timișoara players
New Zealand rugby union players
Rugby union players from Wellington City